The Škoda Karoq is a compact crossover SUV (C-segment) designed and built by the Czech car manufacturer Škoda Auto. Introduced in 2017, the vehicle is based on the Volkswagen Group MQB platform, and replaced the Škoda Yeti. The car slots between the smaller Kamiq and the larger Kodiaq.

The name Karoq is derived from the Aleutian language, spoken by the native inhabitants of the Alaskan island of Kodiak. It is a combination of the Aleutian words "kaa'raq" and "ruq", a car and an arrow, which are the elements of the Škoda logo. It is the second Škoda model to have a name inspired by the Aleuts, after the Kodiaq.

Overview 
The car was officially introduced at a special event on 18 May 2017 in Stockholm, Sweden. The car began to be produced at the turn of June and July 2017 in Kvasiny. The sales started in the autumn of 2017. It is a sister model to the SEAT Ateca, sharing its chassis, roof stamping and side doors, although Volkswagen Group adopted extra measures to maximally differentiate their design by applying each brand's design language.

Compared to its predecessor, the Škoda Yeti, the Karoq is significantly larger. It is 160 mm longer, 35 mm wider and 40 mm lower than the Yeti, and the wheelbase is 60 mm longer. It is not being marketed as the second generation Yeti to have a naming consistency with the Kamiq and Kodiaq. The new Karoq name is also adopted to boost the car's global appeal, since in China, one of the large market for the Karoq, the yeti association is seen as a negative and "polarized", as referred by Škoda board member for sales and marketing Werner Eichhorn.

The Karoq is available in two and four-wheel-drive configurations. Higher trim levels will come with a Driving Mode Select system with five modes, while an Off-Road mode featuring traction control and electronic differential lock is an option on four-wheel-drive models. The Karoq's suspension features a MacPherson-designed front axle with triangular wishbones, and a four-link rear axle. A Dynamic Chassis Control system on the 1.5-litre TSI and 2.0-litre TDI engines will offer three chassis modes which are Comfort, Standard and Sport with electrically operated valves adjusting based on road conditions.

It is Škoda’s best-selling model in 2019, with global deliveries already exceeding 137,700 units in the first 11 months of the year. In 2018, the automaker delivered 115,700 units to customers worldwide, with the total number of units built since the model’s launch in October 2017 reaching the 250,000 mark in mid-September 2019.

China 
The Karoq for the Chinese market is produced by SAIC-Volkswagen, which is the sole manufacturer of Škoda vehicles in China. The vehicle made its domestic debut at the 2017 Guangzhou Auto Show with the Chinese name . It went on sale in January 2018.

The vehicle is used as a basis for a Volkswagen-badged sister model called the Volkswagen Tharu.

Russia 
The Karoq entered production on 12 December 2019 at Volkswagen Group’s Nizhny Novgorod plant in Russia through CKD kits. It went on sale in Russia from February 2020. The standard engine choice is a  1.6-litre MPI naturally aspirated four-cylinder petrol engine, while a  1.4-litre TSI petrol is available for higher trims. The base engine comes with a 5-speed manual or 6-speed automatic transmission and front-wheel drive, while the TSI is mated to either an 8-speed automatic and FWD or a 6-speed DSG transmission with AWD.

Powertrain
The Škoda Karoq is available with several engines for different markets ranging from 1.0 to 2.0-litres, and a choice of front or all-wheel drive.

Facelift
The facelifted Karoq was unveiled in December 2021. It features a completely restyled front and rear end, and received a few new comfort-related features on the inside. It offers a new 10,25" digital gauge cluster, three-zone automatic AC, adaptive suspension DCC (Dynamic Chassis Control) and electric sliding panoramic sunroof for higher trim levels. The new Karoq is first offered in Czech Republic, Slovakia and Switzerland with pre-orders starting December 2021 and delivery to customers is expected in spring of 2022. It is sold in three trim levels: Active (Slovakia and Czech Republic only), Ambition and Style, as well as a sporty Karoq Sportline. Detailed technical specifications were  published in February 2022.

Powertrain

Awards
In the German reading poll Autonis 2017, Auto motor und sport readers voted Karoq the most beautiful car in the class of compact SUV. The German car magazines Auto Bild and Bild am Sonntag have awarded Karoq with the Golden Steering Wheel 2017. The Škoda Karoq won the title Car of the Year 2018 in the Czech Republic in January 2018.

Sales and production figures 
Strong demand for the Karoq forced Volkswagen Group to assemble the car in two additional plants, in Mladá Boleslav, Czech Republic and in Volkswagen plant in Osnabrück, Germany in 2018-2019. In April 2018, Škoda CEO Bernhard Maier said during Škoda's annual results conference that customers in several markets had to wait for up to 10 months for their car to be delivered. It was also manufactured in Bratislava, Slovakia from October 2020.

References

External links 

 Official website

Kodiaq
All-wheel-drive vehicles
Cars introduced in 2017
Mid-size sport utility vehicles
Crossover sport utility vehicles